Hydropunctaria orae is a species of saxicolous (rock-dwelling), crustose lichen in the family Verrucariaceae. It is a marine lichen. Found in Great Britain, it was formally described as a new species in 2012 by lichenologist Alan Orange. The type specimen was collected near Haverfordwest (Pembrokeshire, Wales), where it was found growing on steep rocks on northwest-facing seashore. It has also been recorded in Ireland. The species epithet orae is derived from the Latin ora ("coast" or "edge"). The lichen has a thin, dull mid green to dark greenish-grey thallus that is roughened by tiny warts (punctae) measuring 20–40 μm wide.

References

Verrucariales
Lichen species
Lichens described in 2012
Lichens of Northern Europe
Taxa named by Alan Orange